Malayappa Swami is the current utsava murti (procession deity) in the Tirumala Venkateswara Temple, Tirumala. Malayappa Swami is worshipped during religious ceremonies and processions wherein it would be inappropriate to use the main deity (for example one which requires the deity to be carried or moved). The two deities are worshipped equally and believed to be non-different in personality.

The Malayappa deity is classed as a Swayambhu and was discovered in 1339 AD. Initial records state his original name as Malai Kuniya Ninra Perumal (Lord stood on the hill which bowed low to Him)

History
Ugra Srinivasa was the first utsava murti (procession idol) at the Tirumala Temple. In the 14th century AD, it is said that during the procession, a fire broke out in the village and destroyed most of the houses. Many believe the fire happened because of Ugra Srinivasa's angry aspects since Ugra means angry. Later, it is believed that Venkateswara possessed a devotee and scolded the priests for the way the procession was carried out. Many believe that the Lord was angry due to the fact that the idols of his consorts, Lakshmi and Bhudevi were not placed on the procession alongside the Ugra Srinivasa idol and that the idol was only to be kept in the sanctum. The Lord then revealed a place on the Anjanadri hill where 3 new idols of him and his consorts will be found.

The idols were found in the place mentioned and were believed to be a Swayambhu (self-manifested) idol, a place where the hills appeared to bow very low, and hence he was initially known as Malai Kuniya Ninra Perumal. Over the course of time, his name was shortened to Malayappan or Malayappa Swami. The location where he was found is still known as Malayyappan Konai (Malayappa's corner). From that day on, it is the Malayappa Swami idol which is used for daily processions while the Ugra Srinivasa idol is still kept in the sanctum alongside the main idol of Venkateswara.

Description
Malayappa Swami is seen in the standing pose and is a replica of the Dhruva Beram (The presiding deity). The two upper arms hold the Shankha and the Sudarshana Chakra, while the two lower arms are in yoga poses. The right arm is in the Varada hasta pose (boon giving) and the lower left arm is in the Katyavalambita pose (palm perpendicular to the ground and resting on the hip). The idol stands about three feet tall on a platform of about 14 inches height.

Along with the idol, his consorts - Sridevi and Bhudevi were also found and accepted as Swayambhu (self-manifested) idols.

Sridevi idol
The idol of Sridevi is always placed on the Left-hand side of Sri Malayappa Swami. The idol is 26 inches in height and stands on a 4-inch pedestal. The panchaloha idol is seen with the left hand in the Kataka hasta pose. In this pose, the fingers are partially closed, as if holding a lotus. The right hand hangs loosely on the side and the fingers are held in the Gajakarna pose.

Bhudevi idol
The idol of Bhudevi is always seen on the Right-hand side of the Malayappa Swami idol. The idol is very similar to the idol of Sridevi to signify that Sridevi and Bhudevi represent the two equal spirits of Goddess Lakshmi, the consort of Vishnu. The only difference in the idols is the swap in the hand poses. The idol of Bhudevi has her right hand in Kataka hasta pose and the left in Gajakarna pose. Bhudevi is regarded as the consort of Varaha, Vishnu's third incarnation.

Worship

Order
The order that represents the Lord - Venkateshwara (Main Deity - Dhruva Bēram), Bhoga Srinivasa (Kautaka Bēram), Malayappa Swami with consorts (Utsava Bēram), Ugra Srinivasa (Snāpana Bēram) with consorts and Koluvu Srinivasa (Bali Bēram). Thus the idol of Bhoga Srinivasa should be consecrated directly from the main deity and the Malayappa Swami idol. The order continues downwards to the Ugra Srinivasa idol and finally, the Koluvu Srinivasa idol.

Daily worship
Malayappa swami is used as the utsava murti and marriage to his consorts and post-marriage rituals are performed to the idol every day. Srivari Kalyanotsavam (Lord's marriage festival) is conducted with Sridevi and Bhudevi (goddess of the earth). After the marriage ceremony, the lord and his consorts are seated on various vahanams (Vehicle) as part of the Arjitha Brahmotsavam. Dolotsavam seva has the Lord seated in the Addala mandapam (Mirror hall) and  entertained with vedic hyms. This is followed by serving the Lord with perfumeries, scents and sandal paste to the vedic hyms of Purusha suktam and Sri Suktam and is followed with Abhishekam as part of the Arjitha Vasanthotsavam celebrations. Arjitha Brahmotsavam and Vasanthotsavam functions are the abridged versions of the Brahmotsavam (9 days) and Vasanthotsavam  (3 days) festivals respectively.

In the evening, the Lord and consorts are taken outside the temple as part of the Sahasra Deepalankarana Seva where he is entertained with vedic hyms and annamaya sankirtanas. This is followed by procession on the 4 mada streets surrounding the temple before the lord is taken back into the temple, in time for the ratripuja (night puja).

Weekly sevasVisesha Puja is performed on Mondays when the 'Chaturdasa kalasa visesha puja' (14 kalasas special puja) is performed to the Lord through the utsava murti. During the Sahasra Kalabhishekam puja, abhishekam is performed to Bhoga Srinivasa, Malayappa swami and Visvaksena.

Annual services and festivals

During the Teppōtsavam festival, the idol of Malayappa Swami along with his consorts are worshipped in the Swami Pushkarini (The Holy Lake adjoining the temple) when the Lord is taken to a float constructed in the lake and worshipped during Phalguna Pournami. Abhideyaka Abhishekam is performed every year in the month of Jyesta (July) to protect the idols from damage during processions and other events. The festival lasts for three days with the deities adorned Vajrakavacham (armour studded with diamonds), Mutyalakavacham (armour studded with pearls) and svarnakavacham (armour of gold) for these days. During Padmavathi Parainayam celebrated in May, the wedding of Lord Srinivasa and the Goddess Padmavathi is celebrated in the Narayanagiri gardens for three days. During the three days, Malayappa swami arrives on Gaja (Elephant), Asva (Horse) and Garuda'' (Eagle) vehicles while Sridevi and Bhudevi arrive in separate palanquins. After the Kalyānōtsavam (The commemoration of the weddings of Malayappa Swami), and cultural performances, the idols are taken back to the temple. Pushpa Pallaki festival is celebrated in July at the start of financial year for the lord with the idols taken in procession on a richly decorated floral palanquin.

The idol are taken in procession on various vehicles during the annual Tirumala Brahmotsavam celebrations.

References

Tirumala Venkateswara Temple
Tirumala Idols